Chilingaryan is an Armenian noble surname. Notable people with the surname include:

Artashes Chilingaryan (1883–1968), an Armenian politician
Arsen Chilingaryan (1965–2013), a Soviet Armenian footballer
Artur Chilingarov (1939–present), an Armenian-Russian polar explorer with a Russified variant of the surname

Armenian-language surnames